George Neilson was a Scotland international rugby union player.

Rugby union career

Amateur

He played for West of Scotland.

Provincial

He was capped by Glasgow District in the inter-city match of 5 December 1891.

International

Administrative

Along with his brothers, William and Robert, he was a president of the Scottish Rugby Union. George was the 28th President of the Scottish Rugby Union. He served the 1901–1902 term in office.

Family

His father was James Neilson, an Ironmaster and second cousin of Walter Montgomerie Neilson and his mother was Jane Thomson, daughter of George Thomson, the famous Glasgow shipbuilder. He attended Merchiston Castle School.

He was the brother of Willie, Gordon and Robert Neilson who were also capped for Scotland. In 1891, he made his debut, along with his brother William in the game against  – it is the only time that brothers have debuted together for Scotland, with the exception of the joint debut of Gavin and Scott Hastings. One of the four Neilson brothers played in each of the twenty five matches between Willie and George's debut in 1891, until 1899, when Robert had to withdraw from the Calcutta Cup line-up after breaking his nose.

References

Sources

 Bath, Richard (ed.) The Scotland Rugby Miscellany (Vision Sports Publishing Ltd, 2007 )
 Thorburn, Sandy The History of Scottish Rugby

1872 births
1944 deaths
People educated at Merchiston Castle School
Scottish rugby union players
Scotland international rugby union players
George
West of Scotland FC players
Presidents of the Scottish Rugby Union
Glasgow District (rugby union) players
Rugby union players from South Lanarkshire
Rugby union forwards